This is a list of notable individuals affiliated with Tulane University, including alumni of non-matriculating and graduates, faculty, former faculty and major benefactors. Some especially notable individuals also are listed in the main university article.

Individuals are sorted by category and alphabetized within each category. For alumni, the degree and year of graduation are noted when available.

Alumni

Academia
 Ian Bremmer, political scientist
 Cleanth Brooks, literary critic
 Winston Chang, president of Soochow University
 John R. Conniff, New Orleans and Baton Rouge educator; president of Louisiana Tech University 1926–1928
 Light Townsend Cummins, Bryan Professor of History at Austin College in Sherman, Texas and former official State Historian of Texas
 James H. Dillard, professor and early advocate for education of African-Americans
 Edward F. Fischer, M.A. and Ph.D, Professor of Anthropology at Vanderbilt University
 Mary Lynne Gasaway Hill, American poet, writer, professor at St. Mary's University, Texas and Fellow of the Royal Society of Arts
 James (Mac) Hyman, applied mathematician at Los Alamos National Laboratory in the United States
 T.R. Kidder, archaeologist
 Sang-don Lee, South Korean legal scholar
 John Mosier, historian
 Frank Vandiver, Civil War scholar, acting president of Rice University 1969–1970, president of Texas A&M University 1981–1988
 Linda Wilson, 1957, former president of Radcliffe College

Arts and letters

Architecture
 Robert Ivy, CEO AIA
 Albert C. Ledner, designer of National Maritime Buildings in New York City and many other commercial and residential projects
 Edward F. Neild, architect of the Harry S. Truman Presidential Library and Museum and many buildings in his native Shreveport and Louisiana
 Henry Hobson Richardson, inventor of Richardsonian Romanesque architecture
 A. Hays Town, architect

Film and television
 Marion Abramson, founder of WYES-TV
 Bryan Batt, BA 1985, actor
 Les Blank, BA 1958, MFA 1960, documentary filmmaker
 Marshall Colt, Class of 1970, psychologist and former actor
 Doug Ellin, A&S 1990, television writer/director, creator of HBO's series Entourage
 Evan Farmer, actor
 Paul Michael Glaser, BA 1966, actor, TV's Starsky and Hutch
 Carlin Glynn, NG-N ’61, actress, Tony award winner
 Lawrence Gordon, 1958, producer of popular films such as Predator and Die Hard
 Karen Grassle, actress
 Robert Harling, movie screenwriter, producer and director.
 Courtney Hazlett, A&S '99, columnist and celebrity correspondent for MSNBC
Jonathan Hensleigh, Law, writer of Die Hard: With a Vengeance, Jumanji, Armageddon
 Rick Hurst, actor; A&S '68
 Lauren Hutton, 1964, actress; model
 Anthony Jeselnik, comedian
 Dave Jeser, A&S 2001, co-creator of Comedy Central's Drawn Together
 Anthony Laciura, G '79, actor
 Christian LeBlanc, 1980, actor
 Shannon Lee, daughter of martial arts legend Bruce Lee
 Elyse Luray, NC ’89, star of PBS' History Detectives
 Olga Merediz, NC '78, actress
 Linda Taylor Miller, 1976, actress
 Enrique Murciano, TC ’95, actor, TV's Without a Trace
 Ed Nelson, A&S ’53, UC ’00, actor, Peyton Place
 Bruce Paltrow, 1965, television and film producer
 Meryl Poster, Academy Award-winning and Emmy-nominated producer
 Michael Price, Emmy award-winning writer and producer best known for his work on The Simpsons
 Al Shea, actor and theatre critic
 Jerry Springer, B.A., 1965, talk show host and former mayor of Cincinnati, Ohio
 Harold Sylvester, actor, director
 Ian Terry, winner of the fourteenth season of Big Brother
 Ronald A. Weinberg, American-born Canadian children's television producer (Cinar)

Literature and poetry
John Gregory Brown, novelist, 1982
Amy Carter, G ’96, children's book author; daughter of former President Jimmy Carter
Rich Cohen, writer, 1990
Nicole Cooley, poet; Walt Whitman Award recipient
Peter Cooley, poet
Alcée Fortier, folklorist and recorder of the story of Br'er Rabbit
Whitney Gaskell, Law 1997, novelist
Shirley Ann Grau, 1950, Pulitzer Prize-winning author
Jennifer Grotz, poet
N. K. Jemisin, science fiction and fantasy writer, three time Hugo Award recipient
Harnett Kane, Class of 1931, author of southern history, geography, culture, and fiction
John Reed, author, Snowball's Chance
John Kennedy Toole, BA 1958, author, Pulitzer Prize winner for A Confederacy of Dunces
 Dede Wilson, poet and author

Music
 Les Crane, pioneer in interactive broadcasting, co-creator of pop music "Top 40"
 Paul Crawford, jazz musician, music historian, and music arranger who served as associate curator of the Hogan Jazz Archive 
Odaline de la Martinez, composer and conductor; first woman to conduct in a BBC Proms concert
 John Doheny, jazz saxophonist, band-leader, and historian
 Scott Greenstein, A&S ’81, president of Sirius XM Radio
 Zachary Richard, A&S ’72, Cajun singer/songwriter and poet
 Emily Saliers (attended), singer
 Sonia Tetlow, bass player in rock band Cowboy Mouth
 Janice Torre, lyricist of the song "Paper Roses"
 Michael White, jazz historian and musician

Non-fiction writing and journalism
Andrew Breitbart, '91, publisher and author
Hodding Carter, journalist, Pulitzer Prize winner
Bessie Alexander Ficklen (1861–1945), writer, poet, artist
Robert Lane Greene, magazine journalist
Ira B. Harkey Jr., Pulitzer Prize-winning journalist
Nate Lee, B.A. 1978, writer, senior editor for Chicago's Newcity
Bill Monroe, A&S ’42, broadcast journalist, former host of Meet The Press
Mike Sacks, editor, writer, 1990
Thomas Sancton, editor, writer, civil rights journalist, teacher, 1935
Howard K. Smith, television journalist
Lawrence Wright, author, Pulitzer Prize winner, and journalist

Visual arts
Lynda Benglis, N ’64, sculptor
Jacqueline Bishop, MFA, 1982, visual artist
Deborah Czeresko, M.A., 1992, glass blower, won first season of Blown Away
Mignon Faget, Newcomb 1955, artist, jewelry designer
Mary Garrard, 1958, art historian
Bryan Nash Gill, 1984, artist
Gary Russell Libby, art historian, curator, museum director
Sergio Rossetti Morosini, artist, conservator
Frank Relle, photographer
Wendi Schneider, Newcomb 1977, artist, photographer
Hunt Slonem, B.A., 1973, artist
Meredith Stern, B.F.A. 1998, artist
Cora Kelley Ward, painter

Other
 Alice K. Bache (1903-1977), philanthropist and art collector
 May Hyman Lesser, medical illustrator
 Howard Scott Warshaw, video game programmer/designer and documentary filmmaker

Business and economics
Matt Battiata, CEO, real estate economics expert
Geoffrey Beene, fashion designer
Richard Brennan Sr., restaurateur, owner of Commander's Palace in New Orleans
Neil Bush, B.A., M.B.A., 1979, presidential brother, ex-savings and loan executive
Philip J. Carroll, M.S., 1961, former CEO, Shell Oil Company and Fluor Corporation
James H. Clark, founder of Silicon Graphics, Netscape, and WebMD
Charles E. Fenner, founder of Fenner & Beane, a forerunner of Merrill Lynch
David Filo, B.S. 1988, co-founder of Yahoo!
Alfred Ford, great-grandson of Henry Ford
C. Jackson Grayson, professor at Harvard, Stanford and Tulane; member of the Nixon Cabinet
Thomas M. Humphrey, PhD. 1970, economist
Samuel Israel III, fraudulent hedge fund manager
Jeff Klein - hotelier and real estate developer
Dean Lombardi, J.D., President and GM of the Los Angeles Kings 
Peter McNamara, B.S. CEO, McNamara Enterprises Underground Casino & Book Broker
Ricardo Salinas Pliego, M.B.A., 1979, Forbes World's Richest People
Muhamed Sacirbey, Bosnian-American businessperson
Peter Schloss, Chief Executive Officer, Broadwebasia, Director, Giant Interactive (NYSE: GA)
Aaron Selber Jr. B.B.A., 1950, businessman and philanthropist in Shreveport
Fred L. Smith, president and founder of Competitive Enterprise Institute
Paul Tulane (benefactor), philanthropist
Sam Zemurray (benefactor)

Government and politics

Heads of state
 Luis Guillermo Solis, M.A. 1981, President of Costa Rica

U.S. Senators and Congressmen
 William L. Armstrong, B 1958, former U.S. Representative and U.S. senator from Colorado; president of Colorado Christian University (R)
 Howard Henry Baker Jr., 1945, U.S. Senate majority leader, White House chief of staff, U.S. ambassador to Japan (R) 
 Hale Boggs, Law, 1937, U.S. Representative, 1941–1943, 1946–1972; house majority leader (D) 
 Lindy Boggs, Newcomb 1935, U.S. Representative, 1973–1991, Tulane benefactor, U.S. ambassador to the Holy See, 1997-2001, (D)
 Edwin S. Broussard, U.S. Senator from Louisiana (D) 
 Donelson Caffery, Law, U.S. Senator, 1892–1900 (D)
 James "Jimmy" Domengeaux, Law, Lafayette congressman and Cajun cultural spokesman (D) 
 Allen J. Ellender, Law 1913, U.S. Senator, agriculture committee chair (D) 
 Newt Gingrich, U.S. Representative, 1979–1998 and Speaker of the House, 1995–1998 (R) 
 Tim Griffin, L '94, U.S. House of Representatives from Arkansas (R) 
 Felix Edward Hébert, U.S. Representatives, 1940–1977 (D) 
 Bob Livingston, former U.S. Representative, 1977–1999 (R) 
 John H. Overton, Law, 1897, former U.S. senator from Louisiana (D)
 Pedro Pierluisi, B.A., 1980, Puerto Rico's member of Congress (D) former Attorney General and President, New Party for Progress
 Cedric Richmond, L '98, U.S. House of Representatives from Louisiana's 2nd congressional district (D)
 Jared Y. Sanders Jr., U.S. Representative (D), later States Rights Party
 Luther Strange, B.A. 1975, Law 1978, U.S. Senator from Alabama, 2017–2018 (R)
 Gene Taylor, U.S. Representative, 1989–2011 (D-turned-R)
 David Vitter, Law, former U.S. senator from Louisiana, 2005–2017 (R)

U.S. Governors
 Newton C. Blanchard, former governor of Louisiana (D) 
 Murphy J. Foster Sr., governor of Louisiana (D) 
 Michael Hahn, governor of Louisiana (D) 
 Luther E. Hall, governor of Louisiana (D) 
 Alvin Olin King, former governor of Louisiana (D) 
 Richard W. Leche, former governor of Louisiana (D) 
 Huey Long, Law, former governor of Louisiana (D) 
 John McEnery, former governor of Louisiana (D)
 Francis T. Nicholls, governor of Louisiana (D)
 Jared Y. Sanders Sr., former governor of Louisiana (D)
 Oramel H. Simpson, former governor of Louisiana (D)
 David C. Treen, former governor of Louisiana (R)
 Bob Wise, Law, 1975, former governor of West Virginia (D)

U.S. Cabinet Secretaries and other prominent federal officials
 Howard Henry Baker Jr., 1945, U.S. Senate majority leader, White House chief of staff, U.S. ambassador to Japan (R) 
Regina Benjamin, MBA 1991, Surgeon General of the United States (2009–13)
 Matt Coleman, U.S. Small Business Administration spokesman & Regional Communications Director
 Donald Ensenat, Law, 1973, White House chief of protocol
 Lisa P. Jackson, Administrator of the Environmental Protection Agency (D) (2009–2013)
 Stephen Douglas Johnson, AB '85, L '88, U.S. House Chief Counsel for Financial Institutions and Consumer Credit(1995–98) and Bush White House Senior Advisor to the Office of Federal Housing Oversight (2001–03)

Diplomats
 Howard Henry Baker Jr. (1945), U.S. Senate majority leader, White House chief of staff, U.S. ambassador to Japan (R) 
 Lindy Boggs, Newcomb 1935, U.S. Representative 1973–1991, Tulane benefactor (D), U.S. ambassador to the Holy See, 1997-2001
 Kristie Kenney, G '79, U.S. Ambassador to Thailand, former ambassador to the Philippines and Ecuador  
 John Giffen Weinmann, (A&S ’50, L ’52), former U.S. Ambassador to Finland and chief of protocol in the White House     
 Clint Williamson, (L '86) U.S. Ambassador-at-large for war crimes issues, UN envoy, White House policy official

Mayors
 Sidney Barthelemy, mayor of New Orleans (D)
 Ravinder Bhalla, J.D., mayor of Hoboken, New Jersey
 Paul Capdevielle, Law, mayor of New Orleans 
 Sandra Frankel (née Applebaum), 1963, Arts and Sciences, former mayor of the Town of Brighton, NY (D)
 Ray Nagin, M.B.A. 1994, mayor of New Orleans (D)
 Robert Poydasheff, Law, former mayor of Columbus, Georgia (2003–2007) (R)
 Jerry Springer, B.A. 1965, former mayor of Cincinnati, Ohio and television personality
 T. Semmes Walmsley, Law, mayor of New Orleans (D)

City and state officials
 Joseph Bouie Jr., Master of Social Work, member of the Louisiana House of Representatives for District 97 in Orleans Parish since 2014 (D)  
 Buddy Caldwell, attorney general of Louisiana since 2008; former district attorney in Tallulah (D)-turned-(R)
Philip Ciaccio, state representative, New Orleans City Council member, state circuit judge 1982–1998
 John Elton Coon, state representative from Ouachita Parish; mayor of Monroe 1949–1956, and state fire marshal 1956–1964 (D)
 Eddie Doucet, former state representative for Jefferson Parish 
 Grey Ferris, member of the Mississippi State Senate (D)
 Cameron Henry, member of Louisiana House (R)
 Adam Kwasman, B.A. Economics 2003, member of Arizona House of Representatives District 11; 2014 candidate for U.S. Congress (R)
 Elwyn Nicholson, state senator from Jefferson Parish 1972–1988 (D) 
 Karen Carter Peterson, state representative and candidate for United States House of Representatives from Louisiana (D)
 Weldon Russell, state representative from Tangipahoa and St. Helena parishes 1984–1988; realtor in Amite (D)
 Jock Scott (politician), former state representative from Alexandria (D)-turned-(R)
 Scott M. Simon, architect and state representative (R)
 Eric Skrmetta, attorney from Metairie, Louisiana; Republican member of the Louisiana Public Service Commission for District 1 (R)
 Chris Ullo, member of both houses of the Louisiana legislature 1972–2008 (D)

Other
 Hanan Al-Ahmadi, Assistant Speaker of the Consultative Assembly of Saudi Arabia
 Ashley Biden, social worker, activist, and daughter of President Joe Biden
 Amy Carter, '96, daughter of former President Jimmy Carter; children's book author (D)
 Matt Coleman, U.S. Small Business Administration spokesman & Regional Communications Director
 Jan Crull Jr., Law, 1990, former Native American rights advocate, Hill staffer, international investment banker; multi Marquis Who's Who biographee
 C. B. Forgotston, fellow of Tulane Institute of Politics, lecturer in law, political activist, state government watchdog
 Juan Manuel García Passalacqua, 1967, late leading political analyst in Puerto Rico (D)
 Pedro A. Gelabert, 1956, Puerto Rico Secretary of Natural Resources
 Victor Gold, journalist and political consultant
 John Grenier, Birmingham, Alabama, lawyer and leader of the Alabama Republican Party (R)
 Peter Elgie, BA ‘91
Toronto, Ontario, Canada,
Deputy Leader Green Party of Ontario, 2001-2004, National Campaign Chair Green Party of Canada, 2004
 Supriya Jindal, E '93, B '96, first lady of Louisiana (R)
 Kenneth McClintock, Law, 1980, Puerto Rico's former Senate President (2005–2008); former Secretary of State/Lt. Governor (D) (2009–2013)
 Paul Morphy, L.L.B., April 7, 1857, chess prodigy and unofficial world chess champion 
 Jaime Morgan Stubbe, 1980, president, Palmas del Mar Inc., former Puerto Rico Secretary of Economic Development
 Terry O'Neill, president of the National Organization for Women (NOW)
 Martha Gilmore Robinson (1888–1981), women's rights and civic activist

Law

U.S. Supreme Court justices
 Edward Douglass White Jr., Law, 1868, 9th Chief Justice of the U.S. Supreme Court (D)

Federal and state judges
 Edith Brown Clement, Law, justice, U.S. Court of Appeals for the Fifth Circuit (R) 
 William Tharp Cunningham, preparatory curriculum, Law, judge of the 11th Judicial District in Natchitoches and Red River parishes, member of the Louisiana House of Representatives 1908–1912 (D)
 W. Eugene Davis, Law, 1960, justice, U.S. Court of Appeals for the Fifth Circuit 
 John Malcolm Duhé Jr., Law, Justice, U.S. Court of Appeals for the Fifth Circuit (R) 
 Martin Leach-Cross Feldman, B.A. 1955, J.D. 1957 Federal Judge (R) 
 Rufus E. Foster, Law, 1895, U.S. Court of Appeals for the Fifth Circuit 
 F.A. Little Jr., Class of 1958, former judge of the United States District Court for the Western District of Louisiana (R) 
 Angel Martín, Law, former associate justice of the Puerto Rico Supreme Court
 Tucker L. Melancon, Law, 1973, justice, 5th Circuit since 1994 (D) 
 Judge Henry Mentz, U.S. federal district judge 1982–2005
 Mildred Methvin, Class of 1974, United States magistrate judge for the Western District of Louisiana 1983–2009, based in Lafayette (D)  
 Bill Pryor, Law, 1987, justice, U.S. Court of Appeals for the Eleventh Circuit (R)
 Robert Reid, Law, 1875, Justice of the Louisiana Supreme Court
 Christian Roselius, 1857, chief justice, Louisiana Supreme Court (D)
 Alvin A. Schall, Law, 1969, U.S. Court of Appeals for the Federal Circuit
 Nauman S. Scott, one of the first Louisiana U.S. District Court Judges to advocate desegregation (D)-turned-(R)
 Elizabeth Weaver, N ’62; L ’65, Michigan Supreme Court justice
 Jacques Loeb Wiener, justice, U.S. Court of Appeals for the Fifth Circuit
 Stephen J. Windhorst, B.A., Law, district court judge, former state representative (R)
 John Minor Wisdom, Law, judge, U.S. Court of Appeals Fifth Circuit (R)

Attorneys
 Dean Andrews Jr., attorney convicted of perjury by Orleans District Attorney Jim Garrison
 Sean M. Berkowitz, 1989, chief prosecutor, Enron Task Force
 Terry Michael Duncan, lawyer killed in 1993 Russian constitutional crisis
 William T. Dzurilla, Law, 1981, international attorney and law clerk to U.S. Supreme Court Justice Byron White (1982–1983).
 Jim Garrison, Law, New Orleans district attorney (D) 
Marc Kligman, J.D. 1995, sports agent and criminal lawyer
 Jim Letten, L '79, U.S. attorney 
 Leander Perez, Law, judge and district attorney of Plaquemines Parish in first half of twentieth century (D)
 Ira Sorkin, BA 1965, attorney for Bernard Madoff

Other
 William Suter, Law 1962, clerk of the U.S. Supreme Court 1991–present

Math, science and technology
Jon-Erik Beckjord, paranormal investigator and photographer
Ruth Benerito, Newcomb alumna and inventor of wrinkle-free cotton
Delzie Demaree, 1889 – 1987, botanist and plant collector who taught botany at Tulane from 1956 to 1958.
Willey Glover Denis, 1879–1929, Newcomb A.B. 1899, Tulane M.A. 1902. Biochemist; her appointment as assistant professor at Tulane Medical School has been identified as the first appointment of a woman as a faculty member of a major medical institution in the U.S.
Anna Epps, microbiologist; possibly the first African-American woman with a PhD to lead a medical school.
Joseph Fair, virologist
David Filo, B.S.C.E, co-founder of Yahoo!
Kurt Mislow, 1944, Professor of Chemistry at Princeton University 
Harold Rosen, B.S.E.E, 1947, engineer/inventor, famous for inventing the geostationary communications satellite
Evelyn Walton Ordway, (1853 - 1928) a chemist, suffragist and professor at Newcomb College from 1887 until 1905.
Dave Winer, B.A, Mathematics, 1976, Weblog and RSS pioneer, former Harvard Law School Berkman Center for Internet & Society Fellow
A. Baldwin Wood, B.S.M.E., 1899, engineer and inventor of the wood screw pump (1913) and the wood trash pump (1915)
Ilya Zhitomirskiy, 1989–2011, student, co-founder of the social network Diaspora

Medicine
James Andrews, M.D., orthopedic surgeon
Dale Archer, B.A., 1978, M.D., doctor and television personality
Jim C. Barnett, physician and surgeon from Brookhaven, Mississippi, member of Mississippi House of Representatives 1992–2008
Charles C. Bass, MD, Tulane Medical School dean 1922–1940, researcher in tropical medicine, inventor of modern dental floss  
Regina Benjamin, M.B.A., 1991, U.S. Surgeon General under President Barack Obama; first African-American woman on the American Medical Association Board of Trustees
Gerald Berenson, B.S. 1943, M.D. 1945, heart researcher, preventive medicine pioneer and founder of the Bogalusa Heart Study
Cyril Y. Bowers, M.D., professor of medicine and medical researcher
George E. Burch, M.D., 1933, cardiologist
Jay Cavanaugh, Ph.D, 1994, member of California State Board of Pharmacy 1980–90; director of American Alliance for Medical Cannabis, 2001
Wallace H. Clark Jr., B.S. 1944, M.D. 1947, pathologist, cancer researcher
Michael E. DeBakey, M.D., 1932, pioneer of modern medicine and recipient of the Congressional Gold Medal
E. Wesley Ely, B.S., 1985; M.P.H., 1989; M.D., 1989, physician researcher of delirium at Vanderbilt University Medical Center
Thomas Farley, New York City Health Commissioner
Elizabeth Fontham, M.P.H, 1978, D.P.H., 1983, American cancer epidemiologist, public health researcher, and founding dean of the Louisiana State University Health Sciences Center New Orleans School of Public Health.
Thomas Naum James, M.D., 1949, director, World Health Organization cardiovascular center
Ruth L. Kirschstein, M.D., 1951, director, National Institutes of Health, for whom the Kirschstein NRSA grant program is named
Abraham L. Levin, M.D., 1907, inventor of the Levin Tube, which is still used for duodenal drainage after surgery
Rudolph Matas, M.D., 1880, "father of vascular surgery"
William Larimer Mellon Jr., M.D., M ’53, founder of Albert Schweitzer Hospital, Haiti
José Gilberto Montoya, founder of the Immunocompromised Host Service and works at the Positive Care Clinic at Stanford
Kelly Overton, Activist
Imperato Pascal, MPH & TM, author
Steven M. Paul, B.S. 1972, M.D. 1975, neuroscientist and pharmaceutical executive
Luther Leonidas Terry, M.D., 1935, U.S. surgeon general 1961–1965; chair of the committee that produced Smoking and Health: Report of the Advisory Committee to the Surgeon General of the United States
Paul Wehrle, physician who helped develop of methods to prevent and treat polio and smallpox
Charles B. Wilson, pioneer in pituitary tumor treatment; Cushing Medal recipient

Military
George K. Anderson, General in the United States Air Force
Wayne Downing, General in the US Army
Douglas G. Hurley, NASA astronaut
John L. McLucas, G ’43, Secretary of the Air Force
Richard I. Neal, General in the US Marine Corps
Rick Snyder, ‘84, Vice Admiral, US Navy
William Suter, Law 1962, General, US Army
 Tate Westbrook, Captain, US Navy
James C. Yarbrough, General in the US Army
David H. Berger E '81, The 38th Commandant of the United States Marine Corps 
 Christina Maria Rantetana, MPH '97, rear admiral in the Indonesian Navy

Royalty and religion
 Jorge Bolaños, son of Nicaraguan President Enrique Bolaños
 Francis George, Ph.D., 1970, cardinal archbishop of Chicago
 James G. Heller, rabbi and composer

Sports
 Stephen Alemais, baseball player
 Michael Aubrey, baseball player
 David Mark Berger, A&S '66, NCAA champion, member of 1972 Israeli Olympic weightlifting team
 Jim Boyle, NFL offensive tackle
 Bubby Brister, NG-UC ’85, former NFL quarterback 
 Bobby Brown, Medicine 1950, baseball player, president of the American League
 Janell Burse, basketball player in the WNBA
 Chris Bush, 2004, NFL receiver
 Andy Cannizaro, MLB shortstop and baseball All American
 Jerry Dalrymple, football All-American
 Quincy Davis, 2006, naturalised Chinese Taipei men's national basketball team player
 JaJuan Dawson, 1999, NFL receiver
 Burnell Dent, NFL linebacker
 Corey Dowden, NFL defensive back
 Barbara Farris, UC ’98, WNBA forward, New York Liberty
 Steve Foley, football, quarterback in 1977 near-undefeated season when Tulane beat LSU for the first time in 25 years
 Matt Forte, NFL running back
 Nolan Franz, NFL wide receiver
 Lester Gatewood, NFL center
 Tony Giarratano, MLB, Detroit Tigers
 Fred Gloden, NFL player
 Brandon Gomes, MLB, Tampa Bay Rays
 William (Bill) Goss, Football, 1963-65 • UPI and AP First Team All-SEC linebacker as a senior in 1965 and was the final Tulane player ever chosen All-SEC  • First Team SEC All-Academic in 1965  • Team captain, 1965; Started every game as a sophomore, junior and senior  • Led Tulane in tackles as a junior and senior  • Member of “Fighting 40” team that had just 40 players dressed out on the roster in a growing SEC  • Selected Tulane's team MVP in 1965  • Played in Blue/Gray All-Star Game and started at linebacker in 1965  • Selected by Atlanta Falcons in eighth round of 1966 NFL Draft  • Became SEC football referee, officiating over 200 games in 23-year career  • Led Tulane with three interceptions in 1965
 Jim Gueno, NFL linebacker
 Ryan Grant, NFL wide receiver who is currently a free agent
 Nickie Hall, football player
 Ruffin Hamilton, NFL linebacker
 Phil Hicks, NBA basketball player
 Rodney Holman, 1981, NFL pro bowl tight end
 Linton Johnson III, 2004, NBA player
 Robert Kelley, NFL running back
 Shaun King, 1999, NFL quarterback
 Dominik Köpfer, German tennis player
 Troy Kropog, 2009–present, NFL lineman Tennessee Titans
 Eric Laakso, 1976 Tulane Athlete of the year, NFL offensive tackle
 J. P. Losman, NFL quarterback
 Seth Marler, B ’03, NFL kicker
 Lonnie Marts, 1990, NFL linebacker 1991–2001
 Tommy Mason, NFL running back
 Max McGee, NFL wide receiver
 Sylvester McGrew, NFL defensive end
 Mewelde Moore, NFL running back
 Ed Morgan, baseball player
 Kevin Mmahat, baseball player
 Steve Mura, baseball player
 Eddie Murray, UC ’80, NFL kicker
 Herman Neugass, track & field athlete noted for his boycott of the 1936 Olympic trials
 Phil Nugent, football player
 Micah Owings, MLB, Arizona Diamondbacks, Cincinnati Reds
 Richie Petitbon, NFL player and coach
 Eddie Price, football player
 Patrick Ramsey, NFL quarterback
 Ham Richardson, 1955, tennis player
Taylor Rochestie (born 1985) American-Montenegrin player for Hapoel Haifa of the  Israel Basketball Premier League
Cairo Santos, NFL kicker
 Andy Sheets, MLB shortstop
 Joe Silipo, football player in the CFL, USFL and NFL
 Jerald Sowell, NFL running back
 Mike Tannenbaum, former general manager, New York Jets (NFL)
 Eric Thomas, 1987, NFL defensive back 1987–1995
 Michael Thompson, PGA Tour golfer
 Paul Thompson, NBA player
 Dalton Truax, NFL tackle, Oakland Raiders
 Linda Tuero, tennis, winner of Italian Open
 John "Hot Rod" Williams, NBA player
 Roydell Williams, NFL wide receiver
 Frank Wills, MLB relief pitcher
 Josh Zeid, MLB pitcher
Darnell Mooney, NFL wide receiver
Thakarius “BoPete” Keyes, NFL cornerback

Faculty
 Akira Arimura, professor of endocrinology
 William Balée, professor of Anthropology and Environmental Studies
 Harry Blackmun,  U.S. Supreme Court
 David Bonderman, founder of TPG Capital
 Elizabeth Hill Boone, professor of Latin American art history 1994–
 Christian M. M. Brady, targumist
 Ian Bremmer, political scientist
 Stephen Breyer, U.S. Supreme Court (D)
 Douglas Brinkley, historian
 William Craft Brumfield, professor and historian of Russian art and architecture
 Florian Cajori, historian
 James Carville, political science
 Alfred H. Clifford, mathematician
 Harold Cummins, faculty 1919–1964, anatomist
 David John Doukas, clinical ethicist and professionalism scholar
 John Duffy, medical historian
 Gordon G. Gallup Jr., faculty 1968–1975, developer of the mirror test for self-awareness (1970)
 Kenneth W. Harl, historian
 Melissa Harris-Perry, former Professor of Political Science and anchor for MSNBC
 Maximilian Heller, rabbi, professor of Hebrew and Hebrew literature 1912–1928
 Helmut Otto Hofer, faculty 1965–1977, zoologist and comparative anatomist
 Andy Horowitz, historian, winner of Bancroft Prize (2021)
 Louis J. Ignarro, faculty 1973–1985; Nobel Prize in Physiology or Medicine, 1998
 Walter Isaacson, author and former CEO of CNN; member of the Board of Tulane
 T.R. Kidder, archaeologist
 James A. Knight, M.D., former faculty, psychiatrist, theologian, and medical ethicist  
 Adrienne Koch, historian
 Ida Kohlmeyer, artist and associate on faculty, 1950s
 John S. Kyser, president of Northwestern State University 1954–1966, taught at Tulane in the early 1920s
 Kris Lane, historian and author, Tulane University and University of Minnesota faculty
 Robert K. Merton, sociologist, former head of the Sociology Department
 Claire Messud, novelist
 Alton Ochsner, founder of Ochsner Clinic, pioneer anti-smoking advocate
 William Rehnquist,  U.S. Supreme Court (R)
 John Leonard Riddell, faculty 1836–1865; microscopist, chemist, botanist, geologist, physician, inventor of the first practical mono-objective binocular microscope (1851)
 Charles P. Roland, historian of the American Civil War and the American South, professor at Tulane 1952–1970
Tom Sancton, journalist, musician, Andrew W. Mellon Professor
 Antonin Scalia, U.S. Supreme Court (R)
 Andrew V. Schally, faculty 1962–2006, Nobel Prize in Physiology or Medicine (1977), French Legion of Honor
 J. Lawrence Smith, chemist and inventor of the inverted microscope (1850)
 Raymond Taras, faculty, political scientist
 Royal D. Suttkus, faculty 1950–1990, founder of the largest ichthyology collection in the world
 Lewis Thomas, faculty 1948–1950, physician, researcher, and essayist
 Frank J. Tipler, physicist and author
 Jesmyn Ward, novelist; two-time winner of the National Book Award for Fiction (2011 and 2017)

Tulane presidents

References

External links
 
Famous Alumni List (PDF) at Alumni.tulane.edu

Tulane University people